Huashi Township may refer to:

Huashi Town (花石镇), Xiangtan County, Xiangtan, Hunan Province
Huashi Town (花石镇), in Yuzhou, Xuchang, Henan Province
Huashi Town (华士镇), Jiangyin, Jiangsu Province
Huashi Town (华石镇), Luoding, Yunfu, Guangdong Province
Huashi Township (花石乡), Jinzhai County, Lu'an, Anhui Province

See also
 Huashi (disambiguation)